The Manasquan Public Schools is a comprehensive community public school district that serves students from kindergarten through twelfth grade from Manasquan, in Monmouth County, New Jersey, United States.

As of the 2018–19 school year, the district, comprising two schools, had an enrollment of 1,548 students and 138.9 classroom teachers (on an FTE basis), for a student–teacher ratio of 11.1:1.

The district is classified by the New Jersey Department of Education as being in District Factor Group "GH", the third-highest of eight groupings. District Factor Groups organize districts statewide to allow comparison by common socioeconomic characteristics of the local districts. From lowest socioeconomic status to highest, the categories are A, B, CD, DE, FG, GH, I and J.

In addition to students from Manasquan, the district's high school also serves public school students from Avon-by-the-Sea, Belmar, Brielle, Lake Como, Sea Girt, Spring Lake, and Spring Lake Heights, who attend Manasquan High School as part of sending/receiving relationships with their respective districts. The two Manasquan public school buildings are across from each other on Broad Street, with Board of Education offices next door to the high school.

Schools
Schools in the district (with 2018–19 enrollment data from the National Center for Education Statistics) are:
Elementary school
Manasquan Elementary School with 545 students in grades K-8
Colleen Graziano, Principal
High school
Manasquan High School with 969 students in grades 9-12
Robert Goodall, Principal

Administration
Core members of the district's administration are:
Dr. Frank Kasyan, Superintendent
Dr. Peter Crawley, Business Administrator / Board Secretary

Board of education
The district's board of education, with nine members, sets policy and oversees the fiscal and educational operation of the district through its administration. As a Type II school district, the board's trustees are elected directly by voters to serve three-year terms of office on a staggered basis, with three seats up for election each year held (since 2012) as part of the November general election. The sending districts of Belmar, Brielle and Sea Girt each appoint representatives to serve on the Manasquan school board who are eligible to vote on matters related to the high school.

References

External links
Manasquan Public Schools

Manasquan Public Schools, National Center for Education Statistics

Manasquan, New Jersey
New Jersey District Factor Group GH
School districts in Monmouth County, New Jersey